Dhaijan  is a village development committee in Jhapa District in the Province No. 1 of south-eastern Nepal. At the time of the 1991 Nepal census it had a population of 6741 people living in 1267 individual households. It is surrounded by Duhagadi VDC, in south, Budhabare VDC in north and Mechi Municipality in the west.

See also.

*Haldibari, Nepal

References

Populated places in Jhapa District